The 2011 Wimbledon Championships are described below in detail, in the form of day-by-day summaries.

Day 1 (20 June)
 Seeds out:
 Gentlemen's Singles:  Thomaz Bellucci [30]
 Ladies' Singles:  Kaia Kanepi [17],  Shahar Pe'er [22],  Ekaterina Makarova [28]
Schedule of Play

Day 2 (21 June)
 Seeds out:
 Gentlemen's Singles:  Alexandr Dolgopolov [22],  Janko Tipsarević [23],  Marin Čilić [27],  Nikolay Davydenko [29]
 Ladies' Singles:  Samantha Stosur [10],  Jelena Janković [15]
Schedule of Play

Day 3 (22 June)
 Seeds out:
 Gentlemen's Singles:  Stan Wawrinka [14],  Fernando Verdasco [21],  Juan Ignacio Chela [25],  Milos Raonic [31]
 Ladies' Singles:  Bethanie Mattek-Sands [30]
 Ladies' Doubles:  Chuang Chia-jung /  Hsieh Su-wei [15]
Schedule of Play

Day 4 (23 June)
 Seeds out:
 Gentlemen's Singles:  Viktor Troicki [13],  Florian Mayer [20],  Guillermo García López [26]
 Ladies' Singles:  Li Na [3],  Agnieszka Radwańska [13],  Anastasia Pavlyuchenkova [14],  Lucie Šafářová [31]
 Gentlemen's Doubles:  Rohan Bopanna /  Aisam-ul-Haq Qureshi [4]
Schedule of Play

Day 5 (24 June)
 Seeds out:
 Gentlemen's Singles:  Andy Roddick [8]
 Ladies' Singles:  Vera Zvonareva [2],  Andrea Petkovic [11],  Svetlana Kuznetsova [12],  Daniela Hantuchová [25],  Roberta Vinci [29]
 Gentlemen's Doubles:  Mariusz Fyrstenberg /  Marcin Matkowski [7],  Marc López /  David Marrero [15]
 Ladies' Doubles:  Andrea Hlaváčková /  Lucie Hradecká [7]
Schedule of Play

Day 6 (25 June)
 Seeds out:
 Gentlemen's Singles:  Robin Söderling [5],  Gaël Monfils [9],  Jürgen Melzer [11],  Gilles Simon [15],  Nicolás Almagro [16],  David Nalbandian [28],  Marcos Baghdatis [32]
 Ladies' Singles:  Francesca Schiavone [6],  Julia Görges [16],  Ana Ivanovic [18],  Flavia Pennetta [21],  Maria Kirilenko [26],  Jarmila Gajdošová [27]
 Gentlemen's Doubles:  Max Mirnyi /  Daniel Nestor [2],  Mahesh Bhupathi /  Leander Paes [3],  Mark Knowles /  Łukasz Kubot [10],  Marcelo Melo /  Bruno Soares [13],  Daniele Bracciali /  František Čermák [16]
 Ladies' Doubles:  Julia Görges /  Maria Kirilenko [9],  María José Martínez Sánchez /  Anabel Medina Garrigues [11]
Schedule of Play

Middle Sunday (26 June)
Following tradition, Middle Sunday was a day of rest, with no matches scheduled. Play resumed on the next day.

Day 7 (27 June)
 Seeds out:
 Gentlemen's Singles:  Tomáš Berdych [6],  David Ferrer [7],  Richard Gasquet [17],  Mikhail Youzhny [18],  Michaël Llodra [19],  Juan Martín del Potro [24]
 Ladies' Singles:  Caroline Wozniacki [1],  Serena Williams [7],  Yanina Wickmayer [19],  Peng Shuai [20],  Venus Williams [23]
 Gentlemen's Doubles:  Eric Butorac /  Jean-Julien Rojer [9],  Juan Ignacio Chela /  Eduardo Schwank [12],  Marcel Granollers /  Tommy Robredo [14]
 Ladies' Doubles:  Vania King /  Yaroslava Shvedova [1],  Bethanie Mattek-Sands /  Meghann Shaughnessy [5],  Iveta Benešová /  Barbora Záhlavová-Strýcová [10],  Chan Yung-jan /  Monica Niculescu [12],  Olga Govortsova /  Alla Kudryavtseva [16]
 Mixed Doubles:  Aisam-ul-Haq Qureshi /  Květa Peschke [5],  Philipp Petzschner /  Barbora Záhlavová-Strýcová [7],  František Čermák /  Lucie Hradecká [13],  David Marrero /  Andrea Hlaváčková [16]
Schedule of Play

Day 8 (28 June)
 Seeds out:
 Ladies' Singles:  Marion Bartoli [9],  Dominika Cibulková [24],  Tsvetana Pironkova [32]
 Ladies' Doubles:  Daniela Hantuchová /  Agnieszka Radwańska [13],  Cara Black /  Shahar Pe'er [14]
Schedule of Play

Day 9 (29 June)
 Seeds out:
 Gentlemen's Singles:  Roger Federer [3],  Mardy Fish [10]
 Gentlemen's Doubles:  Wesley Moodie /  Dick Norman [11]
 Ladies' Doubles:  Liezel Huber /  Lisa Raymond [3]
 Mixed Doubles:  Max Mirnyi /  Yaroslava Shvedova [2],  Dick Norman /  Lisa Raymond [10]
Schedule of Play

Day 10 (30 June)
 Seeds out:
 Ladies' Singles:  Victoria Azarenka [4]
 Gentlemen's Doubles:  Jürgen Melzer /  Philipp Petzschner [5]
 Ladies' Doubles:  Nadia Petrova /  Anastasia Rodionova [6],  Peng Shuai /  Zheng Jie [8]
 Mixed Doubles:  Nenad Zimonjić /  Katarina Srebotnik [3],  Andy Ram /  Meghann Shaughnessy [15]
Schedule of Play

Day 11 (1 July)
 Seeds out:
 Gentlemen's Singles:  Andy Murray [4],  Jo-Wilfried Tsonga [12]
 Gentlemen's Doubles:  Michaël Llodra /  Nenad Zimonjić [6]
 Ladies' Doubles: Sania Mirza /  Elena Vesnina [4]
 Mixed Doubles:  Bob Bryan /  Liezel Huber [1],  Rohan Bopanna /  Sania Mirza [6],  Mark Knowles /  Nadia Petrova [11],  Leander Paes /  Cara Black [14]
Schedule of Play

Day 12 (2 July)
 Seeds out:
 Ladies' Singles:  Maria Sharapova [5]
 Gentlemen's Doubles:  Robert Lindstedt /  Horia Tecău [8]
 Mixed Doubles:  Daniel Nestor /  Chan Yung-jan [8]
Schedule of Play

Day 13 (3 July)
 Seeds out:
 Gentlemen's Singles:  Rafael Nadal [1]
 Mixed Doubles:  Mahesh Bhupathi /  Elena Vesnina [4]
Schedule of Play

References

Wimbledon Championships by year – Day-by-day summaries